Cooper Hill is an unincorporated community in Osage County, in the U.S. state of Missouri.

History
A post office called Cooper's Hill was established in 1860, the name was changed to Cooper Hill in 1893, and the post office closed in 1957. The community has the name of J. M. Cooper, an early settler.

References

Unincorporated communities in Osage County, Missouri
Unincorporated communities in Missouri
Jefferson City metropolitan area